Streptomyces fenghuangensis is a bacterium species from the genus of Streptomyces which has been isolated from seawater near Sanya in China.

See also 
 List of Streptomyces species

References

Further reading 
 
 

fenghuangensis
Bacteria described in 2011